Luke 10 is the tenth chapter of the Gospel of Luke in the New Testament of the Christian Bible. It records the sending of seventy disciples by Jesus, the famous parable about the Good Samaritan, and his visit to the house of Mary and Martha. This Gospel's author, who also wrote the Acts of the Apostles, is not named but is uniformly identified by early Christian tradition as Luke the Evangelist.

Text

The original text was written in Koine Greek. This chapter is divided into 42 verses.

Textual witnesses
Some early manuscripts containing the text of this chapter are:
Papyrus 75 (written about AD 175-225)
Papyrus 45 (c. 250)
Codex Vaticanus (325-350)
Codex Sinaiticus (330-360)
Codex Bezae (c. 400)
Codex Washingtonianus (c. 400)
Codex Alexandrinus (400-440)
Codex Ephraemi Rescriptus (c. 450)
Papyrus 3 (6th/7th century; extant verses 38-42).

Old Testament references
: Psalm

Narrative of the Seventy

Protestant theologian Heinrich Meyer calls this section (verses 1-16) the "Narrative of the Seventy" and links it to the earlier account of the sending out of advance messengers in Luke 9:52. The return of the seventy concludes this section (verses 17-20). This passage includes Jesus's assertion that "the laborer is worthy of his wages", which is reflected in similar wording in : 
For the Scripture says, "You shall not muzzle an ox while it treads out the grain", and "The laborer is worthy of his wages".

Some manuscripts refer to seventy-two others. The manuscript evidence "is fairly divided, and it is not easy to conclude what Luke actually wrote. The Textus Receptus refers to 70, but other critical texts note the word δύο, duo, as a potential addition. Both alternatives are linked to the two Old Testament episodes which Eric Franklin considers potentially to have been reflected in Luke's account:
Genesis 10 has a list of the seventy nations of the world, although the Septuagint (LXX) has seventy-two.
Numbers 11 speaks of Moses choosing seventy elders upon whom a portion of the spirit that was upon him would rest, but since two others shared the gift, this could be taken as seventy-two.

Verse 16
"He who hears you hears Me, he who rejects you rejects Me, and he who rejects Me rejects Him who sent Me."
This verse offers confirmation in principle of the fact that Jesus placed on equal grounds the cities which reject the seventy and those which reject Himself. In the second part, the saying rises to a climax: a deepening of the emotion, a solemn conclusion. Matthew's parallel text is entirely positive:
“He who receives you receives Me, and he who receives Me receives Him who sent Me. He who receives a prophet in the name of a prophet shall receive a prophet’s reward."
Luke's treatment retains the positive side of the seventy's potential reception but places more emphasis on the negative.

The Great Commandment and the Parable of the Good Samaritan (10:25-37)

A lawyer or 'expert in the law' asked Jesus what he should do to inherit eternal life.
You shall love the Lord your God with all your heart, with all your soul, with all your strength, and with all your mind,
and to the ordinance of Leviticus 19:18,
You shall not take vengeance, nor bear any grudge against the children of your people, but you shall love your neighbor as yourself.
Jesus confirmed that the lawyer's answer was correct. Luke's treatment of this Great Commandment differs from those of Mark and Matthew, where Jesus directly instructed his disciples that these are the greatest commandments in the Law.

The lawyer then asked who his 'neighbour' is. In response, Jesus told a story of a traveller (who may or may not have been a Jew ) who is beaten, robbed, and left half dead along the road. First a priest and then a Levite come by, but both avoid the man. Finally, a journeying Samaritan comes by. Samaritans and Jews generally despised each other, but the Samaritan helps the injured man. This parable is recounted only in this chapter of the New Testament.

Portraying a Samaritan in a positive light would have come as a shock to Jesus's audience. Some Christians, such as Augustine and John Newton, have interpreted the parable allegorically, with the Samaritan representing Jesus Christ, who saves the sinful soul. Others, however, discount this allegory as unrelated to the parable's original meaning, and see the parable as exemplifying the ethics of Jesus.

The parable has inspired painting, sculpture, poetry and film. The colloquial phrase "good Samaritan", meaning someone who helps a stranger, derives from this parable, and many hospitals and charitable organizations are named after the Good Samaritan.

Mary and Martha (10:38-42)

In Luke's account, the home of Martha and Mary is located in 'a certain village'. Bethany is not mentioned and would not fit with the topography of Jesus' journey to Jerusalem, which at this point in the narrative is just commencing as he leaves Galilee. John J. Kilgallen suggests that "Luke has displaced the story of Martha and Mary".

See also

 Ministry of Jesus
 Miracles of Jesus
 Related Bible parts: Isaiah 14; Matthew 8, 11, 13, 22;

References

External links 
 King James Bible - Wikisource
English Translation with Parallel Latin Vulgate
Online Bible at GospelHall.org (ESV, KJV, Darby, American Standard Version, Bible in Basic English)
Multiple bible versions at Bible Gateway (NKJV, NIV, NRSV etc.)

Gospel of Luke chapters
Phoenicians in the New Testament